The Ilemi Triangle, sometimes called only Ilemi, is an area of disputed land in East Africa. Named after Anuak chief Ilemi Akwon, the territory is claimed by South Sudan and Kenya. The territory also borders Ethiopia and, despite use and "trespass" into the triangle by border tribes from within Ethiopia, the Ethiopian government has never made any official claim on the Ilemi, and in fact agreed that the land was all Sudanese in the 1902, 1907, and 1972 treaties.

Kenya now has de facto control of the area. The dispute arose from the 1914 treaty in which a straight parallel line was used to divide territories that were both part of the British Empire. However the Turkana people—nomadic herders continued to move to and from the border and traditionally grazed in the area. 

The perceived economic marginality of the land as well as decades of Sudanese conflicts are two factors that have delayed the resolution of the dispute.

Peoples 
The nomadic Turkana move in the territory between South Sudan and Kenya and have been vulnerable to attacks from surrounding peoples. The other peoples in this area are the Didinga and Topasa in South Sudan, and the Nyangatom (Inyangatom) who move between South Sudan and Ethiopia, and the Dassanech who live east of the triangle in Ethiopia.

These pastoral people have historically engaged in raids on livestock. While in the past they used traditional weapons, since the nineteenth century onwards the use of firearms has been common.

History 

To the southeast of the Ilemi triangle, Ethiopian emperor Menelik laid claim to Lake Turkana and proposed a boundary with the British to run from the southern end of the lake eastward to the Indian Ocean, which was shifted northward when the British and Ethiopian governments signed a treaty in 1907, reaffirmed by a 1970 Ethiopia-Kenya treaty.

The Ethiopia-Sudan boundary, the "Maud Line", was surveyed by Captain Philip Maud of the Royal Engineers in 1902–03.  It was adopted by Anglo-Ethiopian Agreement treaty of December 6, 1907 between Ethiopia and British East Africa.  Though vague on the precise details of where the Kenya-Sudan border was located, it clearly placed the entire Ilemi on the west side of the Ethiopia-Sudan line.

In 1914 the Uganda-Sudan Boundary Commission agreement provided Sudan access to Lake Turkana via the now-dry Sanderson Gulf at the southeast corner of the Ilemi (at the time Lake Turkana was the border between the British territories of Uganda and Kenya). After World War I, the Ethiopians armed the Nyangatom and Dassanech peoples, whereby the traditional raids turned into battles where hundreds died.

1920s 
In 1928, Sudan agreed to allow Kenyan military units across the 1914 line to protect the Turkana against the Dassanech and Nyangatom, although it cost £30,000 per year. In 1929, Kenya began subsidising Sudan to occupy the territory, which it did not wish to continue because of the perceived useless nature of it. In 1931, it was Sudan that agreed to subsidise Kenya to occupy the territory.

1930s 
In 1931 the Red Line (the Glenday Line) was drawn to represent the northern boundary of Turkana grazing. "In a series of agreements from 1929 to 1934, the Governor-General of the Anglo-Egyptian Sudan and the Governor of Kenya agreed that this Red Line should be accepted as the Turkana grazing boundary."

After Italy invaded Ethiopia in 1936, Italy briefly claimed the area of the Ilemi triangle. A joint Kenya-Sudan survey team in 1938 demarcated the "Red Line" or "Wakefield Line", very close to the delimitation a few years earlier of this Red Line, marking the northern limit of grazing of Turkana.

While Egypt and Britain agreed on this, Italy did not. The Dassanetch and Nyangatom had suffered because of the Italian occupation, and wished to recoup their losses by making a raid against the Turkana. Several hundred Turkana people were killed in a raid in July 1939 by the Nyangatom and Dassanech peoples. Italy gave up their claim on the Ilemi subsequently, and allowed the British to respond with a raid on the Inyangatom and Dassanech supported by the Royal Air Force.

1940s 
British troops of the King's African Rifles occupied Ilemi in 1941 after the East African Campaign during World War II. The King's African Rifles passed through Ilemi on their way to southwestern Ethiopia. In 1944 Britain's Foreign Office surveyed a "blue line" which was further northwest than the "red line".

1950s 
Sudan, in 1950, established their own patrol line even further northwest into Sudan up to the border with Ethiopia, where they prohibited Kenyan and Ethiopian pastoralists from moving north west of it, giving up policing and development to the area south east of it.  However, that Kenya-Sudan agreement specified that this patrol line in no way affected sovereignty; that it was not an international boundary, and money continued to be paid to Kenya to patrol this Sudanese territory.

There was fighting between 1949 and 1953 as Sudan attempted to keep the Nyangatom behind this line. After Sudanese independence in 1956, Sudan has not administered Ilemi or much of the southern part of the country due to the First Sudanese Civil War which began all over southern Sudan.

1960s and 1970s 
In 1967 President Jomo Kenyatta's administration had made overtures to the British in order to secure support for the cession of the Triangle to Kenya. The British were unresponsive and the results amounted to little. The matter was sidelined and successive Kenyan administrations have been seemingly willing to accept the territorial status quo and their de facto territorial control, even if the Kenyan influence did diminish after the relocation of the Sudan People's Liberation Army to Sudan in the 1980s–90s.

In 1964 Kenya and Ethiopia reaffirmed their boundary, confirming Kenyan sovereignty to Namuruputh, which is just south of the southeastern point of the triangle. In 1972 a Sudan-Ethiopia boundary alteration did not solve the Ilemi issue because it did not involve Kenya, but did confirm that Ethiopia had no claim to the Ilemi Triangle.

In 1978 Kenya began to publicly, unilaterally regard the Turkana grazing line of 1938 (Wakefield Line) as an international boundary between Kenya and Sudan.

1980s 
In 1986, Kenya began to widely circulate a new map which for the first time displayed the Ilemi Triangle as an integral part of its territory (no longer displaying the straight horizontal "Maud line").

1990s to present 
In the 1990s, Ethiopia armed the Dassanech with Kalashnikov automatic rifles, perhaps in response to Kenyan government arming in 1978 of the Turkana. Beginning in the 1960s, many Kenyan maps have marked the Red Line as the official boundary of Kenya, rather than a dotted boundary which it had been previously.  More recently, many Kenyan maps depict the 1950 patrol line, the furthest northwest, as the boundary.  There was a question as to whether a secret agreement was broached between Kenya and South Sudan to allow Kenya to administer this territory, in return for support in the Sudanese Civil War.  In recent decades, the countries involved have had other priorities, delaying a resolution to the issue. The recent discovery of oil in the region also complicates resolution.

With the independence of South Sudan in 2011, the Sudanese claim to the Ilemi Triangle was transferred to the new national government in Juba.

See also
 Halaib Triangle
 Al-Fashaga triangle
 Mandera triangle

References

Further reading 
 Ilemi Triangle: Unfixed Bandit Frontier Claimed by Sudan, Kenya and Ethiopia; Author: Dr. Nene Mburu

External links
 Scholarly Article about the Triangle by DR Nene Mburu
 Article in the Sudan Tribune suggesting that Kenya's claim is weak
 Ilemi Triangle, Robert O. Collins, University of California

Territorial disputes of Ethiopia
Territorial disputes of Kenya
Territorial disputes of South Sudan
Kenya–South Sudan border
Ethiopia–South Sudan border
Ethiopia–Kenya border
Border tripoints